Macrosiphini is an aphid tribe in the subfamily Aphidinae.

Genera 
The tribe includes the following genera, listed in alphabetical order:

Abstrusomyzus - 
Acaudella - 
Acaudinum - 
Acuticauda - 
Acutosiphon - 
Acyrthosiphon - 
Akkaia - 
Allocotaphis - 
Alphitoaphis - 
Amegosiphon - 
Ammiaphis - 
Amphicercidus - 
Amphorophora - 
Amphorosiphon - 
Anaulacorthum - 
Anthracosiphon - 
Antimacrosiphon - 
Anuraphis - 
Anuromyzus - 
Aphidura - 
Aphiduromyzus - 
Aphthargelia - 
Artemisaphis - 
Aspidaphis - 
Aspidophorodon - 
Atarsos - 
Aulacophoroides - 
Aulacorthum - 
Avicennina - 
Berberidaphis - 
Bipersona - 
Blanchardaphis - 
Brachycaudus - 
Brachycolus - 
Brachycorynella - 
Brachymyzus - 
Brachysiphoniella - 
Brevicoryne - 
Brevicorynella - 
Brevisiphonaphis - 
Burundiaphis - 
Cachryphora - 
Capitophorus - 
Capraphis - 
Carolinaia - 
Catamergus - 
Cavariella - 
Cedoaphis - 
Ceruraphis - 
Chaetomyzus - 
Chaetosiphon - 
Chaitaphis - 
Chakrabartiaphis - 
Chitinosiphon - 
Chondrillobium - 
Chusiphuncula - 
Clypeoaphis - 
Codonopsimyzus - 
Coloradoa - 
Corylobium - 
Cryptaphis - 
Cryptomyzus - 
Cyrtomophorodon - 
Davatchiaphis - 
Decorosiphon - 
Defractosiphon - 
Delphiniobium - 
Diphorodon - 
Diuraphis - 
Durocapillata - 
Dysaphis - 
Eichinaphis - 
Elatobium - 
Eomacrosiphon - 
Epameibaphis - 
Ericaphis - 
Ericolophium - 
Eucarazzia - 
Eumaerosiphum - 
Eumyzus - 
Ferusaphis - 
Flabellomicrosiphum - 
Fullawaya - 
Gibbomyzus - 
Glendenningia - 
Gredinia - 
Gypsoaphis - 
Halajaphis† - 
Hayhurstia - 
Helosiphon - 
Hillerislambersia - 
Himalayaphis - 
Holmania - 
Hyadaphis - 
Hyalomyzus - 
Hyalopteroides - 
Hydaphias - 
Hydronaphis - 
Hyperomyzus - 
Idiopterus - 
Illinoia - 
Impatientinum - 
Indiaphis - 
Indoidiopterus - 
Indomasonaphis - 
Indomegoura - 
Indomyzus - 
Ipuka - 
Iranaphias - 
Jacksonia - 
Kaochiaoja - 
Karamicrosiphum - 
Klimaszewskia - 
Kugegania - 
Landisaphis - 
Lehrius - 
Lepidaphis - 
Linaphis - 
Linosiphon - 
Liosomaphis - 
Lipamyzodes - 
Lipaphis - 
Longicaudinus - 
Longicaudus - 
Longisiphoniella - 
Loniceraphis - 
Macchiatiella - 
Macromyzella - 
Macromyzus - 
Macrosiphoniella - 
Macrosiphum - 
Macrotrichaphis - 
Margituberculatus - 
Mastopoda - 
Matsumuraja - 
Megoura - 
Megourella - 
Megourina - 
Meguroleucon - 
Metopeuraphis - 
Metopeurum - 
Metopolophium - 
Micraphis - 
Microlophium - 
Micromyzella - 
Micromyzodium - 
Micromyzus - 
Microparsus - 
Microsiphoniella - 
Microsiphum - 
Muscaphis - 
Myzakkaia - 
Myzaphis - 
Myzodium - 
Myzosiphum - 
Myzotoxoptera - 
Myzus - 
Nasonovia - 
Nearctaphis - 
Neoamphorophora - 
Neomacromyzus - 
Neomariaella - 
Neomyzus - 
Neopterocomma - 
Neorhopalomyzus - 
Neosappaphis - 
Neotoxoptera - 
Nietonafriella - 
Nigritergaphis - 
Nippodysaphis - 
Nudisiphon - 
Obtusicauda - 
Oedisiphum - 
Ossiannilssonia - 
Ovatomyzus - 
Ovatus - 
Paczoskia - 
Paducia - 
Papulaphis - 
Paramyzus - 
Paraphorodon - 
Pentalonia - 
Pentamyzus - 
Phorodon - 
Pleotrichophorus - 
Plocamaphis - 
Polytrichaphis - 
Pseudacaudella - 
Pseudamphorophora† - 
Pseudaphis - 
Pseudobrevicoryne - 
Pseudocercidis - 
Pseudoepameibaphis - 
Pseudomegoura - 
Pterocomma - 
Raychaudhuriaphis - 
Rhodobium - 
Rhopalomyzus - 
Rhopalosiphoninus - 
Roepkea - 
Rostratusaphis - 
Sappaphis - 
Scleromyzus - 
Semiaphis - 
Shinjia - 
Sinomegoura - 
Sitobion - 
Smiela - 
Sorbaphis - 
Spatulophorus - 
Spinaphis - 
Staegeriella - 
Staticobium - 
Stellariopsis - 
Subacyrthosiphon - 
Subovatomyzus - 
Taiwanomyzus - 
Tauricaphis - 
Tenuilongiaphis - 
Thalictrophorus - 
Titanosiphon - 
Tricaudatus - 
Trichosiphonaphis - 
Tshernovaia - 
Tubaphis - 
Tuberoaphis - 
Tuberocephalus - 
Tumoranuraphis - 
Turanoleucon - 
Ucrimyzus - 
Uhlmannia - 
Uroleucon - 
Utamphorophora - 
Vesiculaphis - 
Viburnaphis - 
Volutaphis - 
Wahlgreniella - 
Xenosiphonaphis - 
Zinia

Gallery

References

External links 
 

 

Hemiptera tribes